Kwong Chi Yan (born 3 December 1956) is a Hong Kong former cyclist. He competed in the individual road race and team time trial events at the 1976 Summer Olympics.

References

External links
 

1956 births
Living people
Hong Kong male cyclists
Olympic cyclists of Hong Kong
Cyclists at the 1976 Summer Olympics
Place of birth missing (living people)